The following lists the top 25 singles of 2015 in Australia from the Australian Recording Industry Association (ARIA) end-of-year singles chart.

Mark Ronson's track "Uptown Funk", featuring Bruno Mars, was the highest selling single in Australia in 2015 with a sales accreditation of nine times platinum. It spent two weeks at number one, 15 weeks in the top 10, and did not leave the top 100 for the entire year.

Sia's "Elastic Heart" was the highest selling Australian song.

See also
List of number-one singles of 2015 (Australia)
List of Australian chart achievements and milestones

References

Australian record charts
2015 in Australian music
Australia Top 25 Singles